The Shuiyuan Suspension Bridge or Shuanglong Rainbow Suspension Bridge is a suspension bridge in Xinyi Township, Nantou County, Taiwan.

History
The bridge was constructed at a cost of NT$60 million with funding from Nantou County Government, Sun Moon Lake National Scenic Area Administration, and Xinyi Township Office. It was opened to the public on 1 January 2020.

Architecture
The bridge features alternate different color for every 50 meters of its length.

Technical specifications
The bridge spans over a length of 342 meters with 110 meters of clearance below it. It was constructed in parallel with the older bridge built earlier.

Transportation
The bridge is accessible by bus from Shuili Station of Taiwan Railways Administration.

See also
 List of bridges in Taiwan

References

2020 establishments in Taiwan
Bridges completed in 2020
Buildings and structures in Nantou County
Suspension bridges in Taiwan
Tourist attractions in Nantou County